The Maquila Solidarity Network (MSN) based in Toronto describes itself as: 
"A Canadian network promoting solidarity with groups in Mexico, Central America, Africa, and Asia organizing in maquiladora factories and export processing zones to improve conditions and win a living wage."

The network is the secretariat of the Ethical Trading Action Group (ETAG) in Canada. ETAG is an advocating coalition of faith, labour, and non-governmental organizations. They advocate to promote government policies, voluntary codes of conduct, and purchasing policies that promote humane labour practices based on accepted international standards.

A policy of the network is to launch campaigns to help achieve their stated goals.  Some companies or countries being focused on by MSN for a campaign include:

 Nike
 Wal-Mart
 Nation of Burma

Past campaigns of MSN have focused on the following companies among others:

 The Walt Disney Company
 The Gap
 Hudson's Bay Company
 La Senza
 Liz Claiborne
 Mattel
 Woolworth
 Gildan Activewear

External links 
 Official site of the Maquila Solidarity Network

Archives 
 Brand Responsibility Project Records 2004-2012.0.84 cubic feet (2 boxes) of textual materials plus 83.8 GB of digital files.

Political advocacy groups in Canada
Organizations based in Toronto
1995 establishments in Canada